Thompson Square is the debut studio album by the American country music duo of the same name. The album was released on February 8, 2011 via Stoney Creek Records, a division of Broken Bow Records. It includes the singles "Let's Fight," "Are You Gonna Kiss Me or Not," "I Got You," and "Glass."

Content
The album was produced by labelmate Jason Aldean's road band, New Voice Entertainment, which consists of Tully Kennedy, Kurt Allison, David Fanning and Rich Redmond. "Let's Fight" was released as the first single on May 3, 2010, and reached number 58 on the Hot Country Songs charts in June 2010 before being withdrawn from radio in favor of "Are You Gonna Kiss Me or Not", which was released on July 12, 2010. It became their first Number One hit on the U.S. Billboard Hot Country Songs charts in April 2011, and was certified 2× Platinum by the RIAA. The album produced two more singles in "I Got You" and "Glass," both of which were Top 20 hits on the Hot Country Songs chart, with the former reaching the Top Ten.

Reception

Commercial
Thompson Square debuted at number 15 on the U.S. Billboard 200 and number 3 on the U.S. Top Country Albums chart, with first-week sales of 30,028. As of the chart dated July 23, 2011, the album has sold 196,989 copies in the US.

Critical
Reviewing for Country Weekly, Jessica Phillips gave the album three-and-a-half stars out of five. She called the album a "refreshingly honest glimpse into the highs, lows and idiosyncrasies of a relationship", but criticized the sound by saying that it did not "stray far from the country-rock hybrid." An identical rating came from William Ruhlmann of AllMusic, who said that they "make the most of their romantic pairing" but thought that "many of the arrangements are outright rockers". He also criticized the vocal arrangements for favoring Kiefer. Bobby Peacock of Roughstock rated the album four stars out of five, calling the vocals "energetic, dynamic and, best of all, balanced" in addition to praising their chemistry.

Track listing

Personnel

Thompson Square
Keifer Thompson - vocals
Shawna Thompson - vocals

Additional Musicians
Kurt Allison - acoustic guitar, electric guitar
Dan Dugmore - steel guitar
Glen Duncan - fiddle, mandolin
Tony Harrell - Hammond B-3 organ, Wurlitzer
Jizzle Bizzle - electric guitar
Mike Johnson - steel guitar
Tully Kennedy - bass guitar
Steve King - accordion, Hammond B-3 organ
Rich Redmond - drums, percussion
Adam Shoenfeld - electric guitar
Ilya Toshinsky - banjo, bouzouki, acoustic guitar, mandolin

Chart performance

Weekly charts

Year-end charts

Singles

Certifications

References

2011 debut albums
Thompson Square albums
BBR Music Group albums
Albums produced by New Voice Entertainment